The Ulster Titans was a Northern Irish rugby team based in Belfast. They played East 2 of the Ulster Magners Minor League and are members of the International Gay Rugby Association and Board. The club colours are black, yellow and white.

History
The club was founded in February 2007 in order to provide diverse people a chance to play rugby. They first participated in the Bingham Cup 2008 and won the Bingham Shield in a final against Toronto Muddy York. Paul Leonard was chosen as the first Captain in 2007. The founding members are Belfast born Sean Mc Evoy and Dublin born Trevor Mc Mahon who were also chairmen for the club.

Due to dwindling numbers meaning that a full team could no longer support the requirements of the local league the club was officially disbanded in 2010. Many of its members went on to play in other local IRFU affiliated clubs and as part of Barbarian teams in the 2012 Bingham Cup.

See also
 Emerald Warriors RFC

External links
 Ulster Titans

Irish rugby union teams
Rugby clubs established in 2007
International Gay Rugby member clubs
Rugby union clubs in County Antrim
Sports clubs in Belfast
2007 establishments in Northern Ireland